Anthony Eustrel (12 October 1902 – 2 July 1979) was an English actor.

Eustrel made guest appearances on television programs such as Perry Mason, Maverick, Peter Gunn, 77 Sunset Strip, My Favorite Martian, Hogan's Heroes and Get Smart.

Eustrel died in Woodland Hills, California. His ashes are inurned at Chapel of the Pines Crematory.

Selected filmography

 Second Bureau (1936) - Lt. von Stranmer
 The Wife of General Ling (1937) - See Long
 Under the Red Robe (1937) - Lieutenant Brissac
 Gasbags (1940) - Gestapo Officer
 The Silver Fleet (1943) - Lieutenant Wernicke
 The Adventures of Tartu (1943) - German MP Officer 
 Yellow Canary (1943) - Commissionaire (uncredited)
 I Know Where I'm Going! (1945) - Hooper
 Caesar and Cleopatra (1945) - Achillas
 Counterblast (1948) - Dr. Richard Forrester
 Adam and Evalyn (1949) - 1st Man at Restaurant Bar (uncredited)
 The Story of Robin Hood and His Merrie Men (1952) - Archbishop of Canterbury
 Titanic (1953) - Sanderson - White Star Representative (uncredited)
 East of Sumatra (1953) - Clyde
 The Robe (1953) - Sarpedo (uncredited)
 Captain John Smith and Pocahontas (1953) - King James
 King Richard and the Crusaders (1954) - Baron de Vaux
 The Silver Chalice (1954) - Maximus, the Ship's Master (uncredited)
 The Sea Chase (1955) - British Vice-Admiral (uncredited)
 Lady Godiva of Coventry (1955) - Prior
 Lust for Life (1956) - Tersteeg (uncredited)
 The Ten Commandments (1956) - First High Priest (uncredited)
 Li'l Abner (1959) - Finsdale's Second Assistant (uncredited)
 Midnight Lace (1960) - Luggage Salesman (uncredited)
 The Notorious Landlady (1962) - Man (uncredited)
 The Three Stooges Go Around the World in a Daze (1963) - Kandu
 What a Way to Go! (1964) - Willard (uncredited)
 For Those Who Think Young (1964) - Faculty Member (uncredited)
 The Unsinkable Molly Brown (1964) - Roberts
 Goodbye Charlie (1964) - Butler
 One of Our Spies Is Missing (1966) - Steward
 Games (1967) - Winthrop
 Fitzwilly (1967) - Garland
 Bedknobs and Broomsticks (1971) - Portobello Vendor (uncredited)

References

External links
 
 

1902 births
1979 deaths
English male stage actors
English male film actors
English male television actors
Male actors from London
Burials at Chapel of the Pines Crematory
20th-century English male actors
British expatriate male actors in the United States